Stephens Island is an island on the British Columbia Coast, Canada, located in Hecate Strait to the northwest of Porcher Island and to the southwest of the city of Prince Rupert.

The island was named by Captain Vancouver in honour of Sir Philip Stephens, secretary to the Admiralty from 1763 to 1795.

The Early Cretaceous Stephens Island pluton dates to the Albian (102±8 Ma).

Indian reserves

Other features and adjoining islands

Other small islands adjoining Stephens Island include Skiakl Island, Philip Island, Parry Island, Arthur Island, and Joyce Island.

See also
Stephens Island (disambiguation)
Stephens (disambiguation)
Mount Stephens (disambiguation)

References

Islands of British Columbia
North Coast of British Columbia